The 1971 San Francisco State Gators football team represented San Francisco State College—now known as San Francisco State University—as a member of the Far Western Conference (FWC) during the 1971 NCAA College Division football season. Led by 11th-year head coach Vic Rowen, San Francisco State compiled an overall record of 5–6 with a mark of 2–4 in conference play, placing sixth in the FWC. For the season the team was outscored by its opponents 332 to 209. The Gators played home games at Cox Stadium in San Francisco.

Schedule

Team players in the NFL
The following San Francisco State players were selected in the 1972 NFL Draft.

References

San Francisco State
San Francisco State Gators football seasons
San Francisco State Gators football